"" is the seventh single by Japanese singer Angela Aki. It was released on July 11, 2007. It was featured as the "LISMO" CM song.

Track listing

Live performances
 Music Station

References

External links
 Official Discography 

Angela Aki songs
2007 singles
Japanese-language songs
Song recordings produced by Seiji Kameda
2007 songs
Songs written by Angela Aki